Alterations is a four-piece musical group with members David Toop, Peter Cusack, Terry Day & Steve Beresford. Initially active from 1977 to 1986 the group released three albums and performed widely across the UK and mainland Europe. The group play free improvised music with an emphasis on unusual combinations of different styles. "The group were notorious for genre-plundering humour."

"Formed in 1977 by Cusack, the group reveled in an aura of “productive friction,” with their interactions being both collective and combative. They thrived on unpredictability and a tension that produced three records."

Discography (partial) 
 1978: Alterations
 1980: Up Your Sleeve
 1984: My Favourite Animals
 2000: Alterations Live
 2002: Voila Enough!

References

Musical groups established in 1977